Sorghum is a cultivated cereal. The genus Sorghum contains the crop and its wild relatives:
Commercial sorghum, sorghum and its general uses
Sorghum bicolor, the principal modern crop species of Sorghum
Sweet sorghum, any of the varieties of the sorghum plant with a high sugar content

Sorghum may also refer to:
Camp Sorghum was a Confederate States Army prisoner of war camp in Columbia, South Carolina during the American Civil War
Bushton, Kansas, United States (formerly Sorghum)

See also
Red Sorghum (disambiguation)
Sorghum halepense or Johnsongrass.